The 1992 Missouri Tigers football team represented the University of Missouri in the 1992 NCAA Division I-A football season.

Schedule

Coaching staff

Statistics

Passing

Rushing and receiving

References

Missouri
Missouri Tigers football seasons
Missouri Tigers football